This is a list of songs written by Isaac Hayes and David Porter, including those written by Hayes or Porter solo, or with other writers.

Chart hits and other notable songs written by Isaac Hayes and David Porter

Chart hits and other notable songs written by Isaac Hayes solo

Chart hits and other notable songs written by Isaac Hayes with other writers

Chart hits and other notable songs written by David Porter solo or with other writers

References

Hayes, Isaac and David Porter
American rhythm and blues songs